Pincher may refer to:

Geography
 Pincher Station, Alberta
Pincher Creek a town in the southwest of Alberta, Canada

People
 Chapman Pincher (1914–2014), English journalist, historian and novelist, especially on espionage 
 Chris Pincher (born 1969),  British  politician
 Pinchers, Jamaican reggae and dancehall artist

Other
 Pincher (Gobots), a transforming robot toy 
A misspelling for Pincers (tool)

See also
 Pincher Martin, a novel by William Golding
 Pinscher, a type of dog
 Pinches, a surname